Naogaon-6 is a constituency represented in the Jatiya Sangsad (National Parliament) of Bangladesh since October 2020 by Anwar Hossain Helal of the Awami League.

Boundaries 
The constituency encompasses Atrai and Raninagar upazilas.

History 
The constituency was created in 1984 from the Rajshahi-9 constituency when the former Rajshahi District was split into four districts: Nawabganj, Naogaon, Rajshahi, and Natore.

Members of Parliament

Elections

Elections in the 2010s 
Israfil Alam was re-elected unopposed in the 2014 general election after opposition parties withdrew their candidacies in a boycott of the election.

Elections in the 2000s

Elections in the 1990s

References

External links
 

Parliamentary constituencies in Bangladesh
Naogaon District